The 2000 NBA Finals was the championship round of the National Basketball Association (NBA)'s 1999–2000 season, and the conclusion of the season's playoffs. The Western Conference champion Los Angeles Lakers defeated the Eastern Conference champion Indiana Pacers 4 games to 2. This was the Lakers' first championship in twelve years. Lakers center Shaquille O'Neal was named the NBA Finals Most Valuable Player (MVP) of the series, in arguably one of the best Finals performances in history putting up 38 PPG, 16 rebounds and 2 blocks, his first of three consecutive honors. The series was played under a best-of-seven format, with the Lakers holding home court advantage. The series featured the number one seeds from both conferences.

Background

Los Angeles Lakers

Although the Lakers were one of the more talented teams in the NBA the previous year, they failed to win a single game against the San Antonio Spurs in the 1999 NBA playoffs. Twenty-four days after being swept by the eventual league champion, the Lakers signed Phil Jackson as head coach. Jackson, famous for coaching Michael Jordan and the six-time champion Chicago Bulls, would build his triangle offense around Shaquille O'Neal and Kobe Bryant. General Manager Jerry West surrounded O'Neal and Bryant with effective role players such as Glen Rice, Ron Harper (who had experience with Jackson's triangle offense as part of the 1996–1998 Bulls), and A. C. Green (member of the last two Lakers championship teams).

Along with these starters, the Lakers also possessed a strong bench. Robert Horry not only had championship experience with the Houston Rockets but also was a threat on the perimeter and a defensive star. Derek Fisher was a defensively minded point-guard with the ability to shoot well from long range. Rick Fox, acquired after being released by the Boston Celtics, was the Lakers' sixth man.

With a healthy O'Neal, the Lakers dominated the regular season. They posted a 33–7 record after 40 games, the second-best record after 40 games in franchise history, trailing only the 1971-72 Lakers who posted a record of 37-3 after 40 games. They posted winning streaks of 11, 16, and 19 en route to a 67–15 record, tying the 1992 Chicago Bulls and 1986 Boston Celtics as the fifth best record in NBA regular season history.

Although many expected the Lakers to reach the Finals, the road would be a rocky one. In the first round, the Lakers won the first two games against the Sacramento Kings, only to drop the next two games in Sacramento. The Lakers then defeated Sacramento in Game 5, 113–86, to face the Phoenix Suns in the conference semifinals. The Lakers clobbered the Suns, winning the series 4–1 (with their only loss coming in Game 4). In Game 1 of the Western Conference Finals against the Portland Trail Blazers, Rasheed Wallace earned two technical fouls and was ejected; the Lakers took advantage of Wallace's absence and secured victory. The Trail Blazers stormed back in the next game, giving the Lakers their worst home loss of the season in a 106–77 shellacking. This setback did not affect Los Angeles, as they assembled a 3–1 series lead by winning the next two games in Portland. The Lakers underestimated the Trail Blazers, however. Led by former Jackson linchpin Scottie Pippen, Portland won back-to-back elimination games and forced a series-deciding Game 7. Amid several controversial foul calls by referee Dick Bavetta against members of the Trail Blazers, Portland relinquished a 75–60 fourth quarter lead. Rallying back with a 25–4 run, the Lakers won the game and secured a berth in the NBA Finals.

Indiana Pacers

In the 1997–1998 NBA season, the Chicago Bulls narrowly defeated the Pacers, 4 games to 3, in the Eastern Conference Finals. The 1998–1999 NBA season began with a lockout but saw Indiana return to the Eastern Conference Finals, where they lost to the New York Knicks. The 1999–2000 NBA season brought several major changes to the Pacers. It was their first season at Conseco Fieldhouse, as well as their first since 1993 without center Antonio Davis, who was traded for the rights to the No. 5 overall pick in the 1999 NBA Draft. Jalen Rose replaced Chris Mullin in the starting line up, winning the NBA Most Improved Player award, while Austin Croshere replaced him as the sixth man.

The Pacers started the season 7–7 but eventually finished with an Eastern Conference best 56–26 record, including a franchise-best 25 game win streak at home. The Pacers, like the Lakers, struggled in the playoffs. They needed a clutch Travis Best three-pointer to dispatch the Milwaukee Bucks in five games. Indiana faced the Philadelphia 76ers in the second round and took the series in six games, earning a trip to the Eastern Conference Finals. The Pacers would face their rival Knicks, winning a memorable six-game series in a reversal of fortunes from years past. With the victory, Indiana advanced to the first NBA Finals in franchise history, becoming the second former ABA team to do so after the Spurs the previous season.

Road to the Finals

Regular season series
Both teams split the two meetings, each won by the home team:

2000 NBA Finals rosters

Los Angeles Lakers

Indiana Pacers

Series summary

The Finals were played using a 2–3–2 site format, where the team with home court advantage would receive the first two games and the last two games at home. The NBA, after experimenting in the early years, restored this original format for the Finals in 1985. So far, the other playoff series are still running on a 2–2–1–1–1 site format.  The Finals returned to a 2-2-1-1-1 format in 2014. Additionally, both teams in the Finals featured newly-built arenas, as the Lakers' Staples Center and the Pacers' Gainbridge Fieldhouse opened at the beginning of the 1999–2000 NBA season.

This was the second time a Finals game was played on a Monday night since the NBA switched to the Wednesday-Friday-Sunday rotation in 1991. In the previous five series (1992–94, 1996, 1998) that needed a Game 6, the game was played on a Sunday. In this series, however, the NBA chose to play the game the Monday night after Father's Day. The previous Finals game played on a Monday night was Game 3 in 1999.

Game 1

The Lakers dominated from the start. The Lakers shot 15-for-20 (75%) in the first period while the Pacers shot only 7-for-20 (35%). Reggie Miller would miss all of his shots in the first quarter to give the Lakers a 15-point lead. Austin Croshere came off the bench to keep the Pacers alive in the 2nd quarter, scoring 9 points and grabbing 4 rebounds in the quarter. Although the Pacers attempted a comeback in the 2nd quarter, they were still down by 12. In the 3rd quarter, it would be Mark Jackson who led the Pacers to a comeback, cutting the Lakers lead to 2. Reggie Miller also hit his first field goal in the 3rd quarter, though it would be his last. The Lakers handled the Pacers in the final quarter, with a 13–2 run winning by 17 points. Shaquille O'Neal scored 43 points and grabbed 19 rebounds.

Game 2

Los Angeles and Indiana were evenly matched for the first quarter, both scoring 28. However, Los Angeles suffered a major setback when Kobe Bryant left the game in the 1st quarter due to a sprained ankle and did not return. Jalen Rose later admitted that he intentionally stuck out his foot when Kobe shot a jumpshot in order to trip him when he landed. Ron Harper went in for Bryant and scored 21 points for the game. Desperate to try to gain the lead, Larry Bird resorted to the "Hack-a-Shaq" strategy. Shaq shot 39 free throws, making only 18, an NBA record for most free throws attempted. Despite this low percentage, Shaq made 9 of 16 in the 4th quarter to keep a Lakers lead. The Pacers cut the lead to 99–96 and were looking to foul Shaq, but when Shaq got the ball he passed to Robert Horry who converted not only the layup, but the foul shot as well giving them a 102–96 lead en route to a 111–104 Lakers victory.

Game 3

Taking advantage of Kobe Bryant's ankle injury, Indiana restored a semblance of parity to the proceedings. Kobe's absence was felt as the Pacers had an 11–2 run in the first quarter to take an 8-point lead. Austin Croshere once again had another huge 2nd quarter, scoring 8 points as the Pacers shot 61% from the field. The Lakers tried to make a run to get back into the game, but upon doings so, Indiana answered with 12 straight points and led by 17. The Lakers were desperate and attempted another run to get within 3 points, but Reggie Miller nailed all his free throws at the end of the game to give Indiana a 9-point win.

Game 4

The Pacers took a quick 9–2 lead due to Rik Smits hitting his first four shots. Kobe Bryant attempted to play with his sore ankle but only managed to score 6 points in the first half. Even though Bryant and O'Neal were in foul trouble in the first half (each picking up his third with 5 minutes remaining in the second quarter), Indiana could not take advantage and did not extend their lead. This would be a problem as Kobe Bryant scored 10 points and the Lakers took a 62–60 lead due to a Glen Rice three-pointer. The game remained close going into the fourth quarter, when O'Neal and Reggie Miller scored 14 and 13 points respectively, sending the game into overtime. Midway through overtime, O'Neal committed his sixth foul but 21-year-old Bryant delivered three clutch shots, as the Lakers were able to overcome back-up center John Salley's inability to effectively defend Smits. Smits and Miller scored all 14 of Indiana's OT points, but it was not enough to overcome as Miller missed a last-second three-pointer, and L.A. was able to pull one out in Indianapolis. Shaquille O'Neal was the first final NBA MVP player to foul out in the NBA Finals until Stephen Curry of the Golden State Warriors fouled out in Game 6 of the 2016 NBA Finals.

Game 5

Reggie Miller and the Pacers dominated the game from the start in what would be Larry Bird's last game as a coach in the state of Indiana. Reggie Miller came out and made 5 straight shots including a 4-point play. The Pacers hit their first 6 three point shots in the game. The Pacers would have a 20-point lead in the 2nd quarter, and eventually won by 33 – it was the worst Lakers NBA Finals loss since the 148–114 loss to Boston in the 1985 NBA Finals, known as the "Memorial Day Massacre."

With their loss in Game 5, the Lakers record in close-out games dropped to 3–6 in the 2000 NBA Playoffs (the other losses coming in Games 3 and 4 in the first round against Sacramento, Game 4 in the series against Phoenix, and Games 5 and 6 versus Portland). As a result, the series returned to California.

Game 6

After the two teams traded blows in the first quarter, Mark Jackson concluded the period with a turn-around half-court shot at the buzzer to give the Pacers a 26–24 advantage. They would not relinquish their lead until the fourth quarter. In the first half, the Pacers would lead by as many as twelve points. However, the Lakers chipped away and entered intermission trailing 56–53. Indiana added two more points to their lead, and entered the final period in a position to force a decisive seventh game.

In the fourth quarter, the momentum shifted. The Lakers got four timely three-pointers from Derek Fisher, Robert Horry, and Rick Fox. The turning point occurred on a play where Brian Shaw stole the ball from Jalen Rose, leading to a fast break where Shaquille O'Neal hit an off-balance shot to give the Lakers the lead. The Pacers never led after that point.

The Lakers would build a seven-point lead, but the Pacers fought back to tie the score at 103. After a timeout, the Lakers scored six unanswered points to regain control. The Pacers made one final valiant effort, but it fell short and the Lakers clinched their first championship in twelve years. Shaquille O'Neal led all scorers with 41 points and also pulled down 12 rebounds. He was awarded the Finals MVP.

Player statistics

Los Angeles Lakers

|-
| align="left" |  || 5 || 5 || 35.2 || .367 || .200 || .909 || 4.6 || 4.2 || 1.0 || 1.4 || 15.6 
|-
| align="left" |  || 6 || 0 || 18.7 || .429 || .583 || .833 || 1.0 || 3.8 || 0.8 || 0.0 || 6.0 
|-
| align="left" |  || 6 || 0 || 17.3 || .611 || .625 || .867 || 1.7 || 1.0 || 0.5 || 0.0 || 6.7 
|-
| align="left" |  || 1 || 0 || 3.0 || .000 || .000 || .500 || 1.0 || 0.0 || 0.0 || 0.0 || 1.0 
|-
| align="left" |  || 6 || 6 || 17.2 || .571 || .000 || .857 || 3.3 || 0.5 || 0.2 || 0.0 || 5.0
|-
| align="left" |  || 6 || 6 || 30.7 || .464 || .400 || .700 || 3.3 || 4.8 || 1.3 || 0.2 || 10.8 
|-
| align="left" |  || 6 || 0 || 30.3 || .512 || .200 || .727 || 5.2 || 2.8 || 0.8 || 1.0 || 9.2 
|-
| align="left" |  || 4 || 0 || 2.3 || .667 || .000 || 0.5 || 0.5 || 0.0 || 0.0 || 0.0 || 1.3 
|-! style="background:#FDE910;"
| align="left" |  || 6 || 6 || 45.5 || .611 || .000 || .387 || 16.7 || 2.3 || 1.0 || 2.7 || 38.0 
|-
| align="left" |  || 6 || 6 || 32.2 || .400 || .632 || .650 || 2.5 || 1.7 || 0.8 || 0.2 || 11.5 
|-
| align="left" |  || 4 || 0 || 3.3 || .667 || .000 || .000 || 0.8 || 0.0 || 0.3 || 0.0 || 1.0
|-
| align="left" |  || 6 || 1 || 18.8 || .216 || .000 || 1.000 || 2.8 || 2.8 || 0.3 || 0.0 || 3.0 

Indiana Pacers

|-
| align="left" |  || 2 || 0 || 3.0 || .667 || .000 || .750 || 0.5 || 0.0 || 0.5 || 0.0 || 3.5 
|-
| align="left" |  || 6 || 0 || 16.3 || .467 || .500 || .833 || 1.2 || 2.2 || 0.7 || 0.2 || 5.8 
|-
| align="left" |  || 6 || 0 || 24.2 || .545 || .400 || .867 || 6.0 || 0.8 || 0.3 || 1.0 || 15.2 
|-
| align="left" |  || 6 || 6 || 29.5 || .575 || .000 || .545 || 10.0 || 1.0 || 0.3 || 1.0 || 8.7 
|-
| align="left" |  || 6 || 6 || 31.0 || .413 || .400 || 0.8 || 5.3 || 7.7 || 0.8 || 0.0 || 9.7 
|-
| align="left" |  || 6 || 0 || 12.0 || .500 || .500 || .667 || 3.2 || 0.2 || 0.3 || 0.2 || 1.8 
|-
| align="left" |  || 6 || 6 || 42.0 || .413 || .375 || .978 || 2.7 || 3.7 || 0.8 || 0.3 || 24.3 
|-
| align="left" |  || 3 || 0 || 4.0 || .500 || .000 || .667 || .000 || 0.3 || 0.3 || 0.3 || 1.3 
|-
| align="left" |  || 6 || 0 || 21.8 || .379 || .478 || .750 || 4.0 || 1.0 || 0.5 || 0.0 || 6.0 
|-
| align="left" |  || 6 || 6 || 43.2 || .467 || .500 || .833 || 4.5 || 3.0 || 0.8 || 0.3 || 23.0 
|-
| align="left" |  || 6 || 6 || 19.3 || .466 || .000 || 1.000 || 4.0 || 0.5 || 0.5 || 1.2 || 10.0 
|-
| align="left" |  || 3 || 0 || 3.7 || .500 || .000 || .000 || 0.3 || 0.0 || 0.0 || 0.0 || 0.7

Broadcasting
The 2000 NBA Finals was aired in the United States on NBC, with Bob Costas and Doug Collins on play-by-play and color commentary respectively. Even though Marv Albert had been rehired by NBC Sports in 1999 following his infamous sex scandal, NBC opted to keep Costas as the lead play-by-play man to avoid any negative publicity. Albert was eventually promoted back to the lead role before the succeeding season.

Hannah Storm served as the studio host while Isiah Thomas, Bill Walton and Steve "Snapper" Jones served as studio analysts. Ahmad Rashad and Jim Gray served as sideline reporters.

Aftermath
This was the first NBA championship for the Lakers since . It was also the first major professional sports championship for the city of Los Angeles since that same year, when the Dodgers won the 1988 World Series. This championship came in the Lakers’ first year in their new arena, Staples Center. The Lakers held a championship parade on June 21, 2000.

However, the Lakers were unable to score home-court advantage throughout the playoffs in the latter two, yielding them to the San Antonio Spurs and Sacramento Kings, respectively. In addition, the Lakers were able to beat both of those teams in the Conference Finals. They won the championship over the Philadelphia 76ers and New Jersey Nets, respectively.

, the series remains the Pacers’ only NBA Finals appearance. The Pacers would rebuild in the subsequent season. Retiring center Rik Smits was replaced by future NBA All-Star Jermaine O'Neal, acquired from Portland in the deal for Dale Davis. Mark Jackson and Chris Mullin both left as free-agents. The Pacers continued to make the playoffs every season until 2006, the year after Reggie Miller retired.

Riots 
During the Lakers' victory on June 18, an estimated crowd of over 6,000 fans gathered outside Staples Center to view the game and later celebrate the victory. However; as the crowd grew during the night following the victory, fans began acting unruly until the celebrations devolved into a riot. Fans began lighting numerous bonfires or torching nearby cars in the street, things devolved quickly as vandals also began looting and vandalizing nearby buildings. LAPD was criticized for its late response hours after the damage began, there was no released total of the overall property damage but 70 cars and a local dealership were destroyed. Upon seeing the destruction following the victory, owner Dr. Jerry Buss and Magic Johnson would heavily condemn the vandalism and urge fans to leave the area and celebrate in peace. LAPD were forced to re evaluate their security plans for that election year's Democratic National Convention following the destruction.

See also
2000 NBA Playoffs

References

External links
NBA History

NBA Basketball Stat Reference

National Basketball Association Finals
Finals
NBA
NBA
NBA Finals
NBA Finals
2000s in Indianapolis
2000 in Los Angeles
Basketball competitions in Indianapolis
Basketball competitions in Los Angeles
June 2000 sports events in the United States